Clüver is a surname. Notable people with the surname include:

 Bernd Clüver (1948–2011), German singer
 Philipp Clüver (1580–1622), German historian

See also
 Clover (surname)